The following is a list of recurring Saturday Night Live characters and sketches introduced during the forty-second season of SNL, which began on October 1, 2016.

Action 9 News At Five
Television reporters interview survivors of a calamity, but the focus shifts to the survivors' quirks. The "Name Change Office" became a recurring sketch within the larger "Action 9 News at Five" recurring sketch.

Matt Schatt
An unimpressive man's (Mikey Day) marriage to a beautiful woman, played by the host, confuses everyone who interacts with them.

Debette Goldry
Kate McKinnon plays an elderly actress, introduced as "the incomparable Debette Goldry," who talks about how hard her life was during the Golden Era of Hollywood.

Melania Moments
A series of short vignettes with Melania Trump (Cecily Strong) contemplating things that happen in her life. Beck Bennett narrates. Written by Julio Torres.

David S. Pumpkins
Friends enter a horror themed ride, where the operator (Kenan Thompson) opens various doors that initially reveal horror characters that scare them. The doors then open to reveal David S. Pumpkins, a man wearing a black and orange pumpkin-themed suit (Tom Hanks), and his two dancing skeleton sidekicks (Mikey Day, Bobby Moynihan), which the friends find unscary and confusing.

Leslie & Kyle love story
A mockumentary series depicting the fictional romance between Leslie Jones and Kyle Mooney, and the love triangle that forms between them and Colin Jost.

A precursor to the sketches, Kyle vs Kanye, was aired on February 13, 2016, during the season 41 episode hosted by Melissa McCarthy. Another sketch, New Cast Member, with Mooney playing both himself and a rarely-featured cast member, was cut for time from the season 44 episode hosted by Idris Elba. New Cast Member featured Jones and had a similar premise to the above sketches, but no mention was made of their relationship. These sketches stopped after season 44, since Jones left the show at the end of the season, but there are several more similar sketches, including one from season 45, titled "Kyle's Transformation", where Kyle transforms his body, so he can get into a sketch about male strippers. There are two of these from season 46, with the sketch "Dancer", with host Issa Rae, where Mooney proves to Rae that he could be Justin Bieber (who was that episode's musical guest)’s backup dancer, only to have his dreams cut short, and in another sketch, but was cut for time, titled "Kyle and Friends" (host Regina King), Mooney reevaluates how he fits in at the world of SNL by putting himself out there. From season 47, there's "Kyle's Holiday", where Billie Eilish served as host and musical guest. In the sketch, Mooney reflects on those that bring him joy, while trying to find Christmas plans. The second one being "Serious Night Live", where host Jake Gyllenhaal and Michael Che uncover some of Mooney's problems in a new dramatic, non-comedy series, 'Serious Night Live', those were the last of those sketches, as Mooney left at the end of season 47.

Posters
Pete Davidson plays a student with posters (for example, characters from a Black Panther-like superhero movie) in his room. He dreams about them telling him not to drop out of school, instead helping him work hard and focus on his studies. However, one such poster is of airheaded glamour model Krissy Knox (Emma Stone), who instead focuses on the product she is posing with.

Pete Davidson's First Impressions
Pete Davidson critiques the looks of various people involved in politics.

Dirty Talk
A woman (Melissa Villasenor) attempts to talk dirty with her boyfriend (played by the host), but ends up unintentionally turning him off with inappropriate methods.

Guy Who Just Bought A Boat
Alex Moffat plays a man who uses slang to show that he is wealthy, which compensates for his small penis.

The Duncans
Leslie Jones and Mikey Day play a couple who discuss their sex lives on Weekend Update.

Eric and Donald Trump Jr.
Eric (Alex Moffat) and Donald Jr. (Mikey Day) talk to Colin Jost on Weekend Update to discuss their father's actions, but Eric's cluelessness interrupts his brother's arguments. The brothers have also appeared outside of Weekend Update.

Dog Translator
Three scientists, Helen (Scarlett Johansson) and two associates (Mikey Day and Kyle Mooney) demonstrate a machine that can translate animals' thoughts. The presentation is derailed by the machine's apparently accurate broadcasting of Helen's dog Max's (voice of Beck Bennett) arguments in favor of Donald Trump and his policies, as well as Max's criticism of Helen's lifestyle and her decision to neuter him. Helen and the project's investors (Cecily Strong and Alex Moffat) are horrified.

Dawn Lazarus
Weekend Update's nervous and inexperienced meteorologist Dawn Lazarus (Vanessa Bayer) presents the weather in an incomprehensible manner. The character was very short lived, as it was introduced in the third-to-last episode of Bayer's last season; she had been trying to develop the concept since earlier that year.

Morning Joe
Joe Scarborough (Alex Moffat) and Mika Brzezinski (Kate McKinnon) host their morning news talk show. They display flirtatious behavior that baffles their in-studio guests, including Willie Geist (Mikey Day). When interviewing their via-satellite guests, they bombard them with questions without letting them give their answers. The sketch also parodies Scarborough's love for classic rock music.

References

Lists of recurring Saturday Night Live characters and sketches
Saturday Night Live in the 2010s